Irvin V. Willat (November 18, 1890 – April 17, 1976) was an American film director of the silent film era. He directed 39 films between 1917 and 1937. Early in his career Willat worked as a cinematographer on several films. His older brother Edwin Willat (1882–1950) was cinematographer on several silent films.

Partial filmography

 Uncle Tom's Cabin (1914)
The Guilty Man (1918)
The Law of the North (1918)
The False Faces (1919)
Rustling a Bride (1919)
A Daughter of the Wolf (1919)
The Grim Game (1919)
Behind the Door (1919)
Below the Surface (1920)
Down Home (1920)
 Partners of the Tide (1921)
 Fifty Candles (1921)
 The Face of the World (1921)
The Siren Call (1922)
On the High Seas (1922)
Pawned (1922)
All the Brothers Were Valiant (1923)
Fog Bound (1923)
 Three Miles Out (1924)
Heritage of the Desert (1924)
Wanderer of the Wasteland (1924)
The Story Without a Name (1924)
North of 36 (1924)
The Air Mail (1925)
Rugged Water (1925)
The Ancient Highway (1925)
The Enchanted Hill (1926)
Paradise (1926)
Back to God's Country (1927)
The Cavalier (1928)
The Michigan Kid (1928)
The Isle of Lost Ships (1929)
Old Louisiana (1937)
 Luck of Roaring Camp (1937)
Under Strange Flags (1937)

References

External links

1890 births
1976 deaths
20th-century American male actors
Male actors from Stamford, Connecticut
Film directors from Connecticut